Eric Macheru (February 25, 1986), is a South African actor and former footballer prominently known for portraying Leeto Maputla on the soap opera, Skeem Saam on SABC1.

References

1986 births
Living people
South African male actors
People from Polokwane
Cape Town Spurs F.C. players
Platinum Stars F.C. players

Association footballers not categorized by position
South African soccer players